Kevin Cadle (March 17, 1955 – October 16, 2017) was a British-based American sports presenter and former basketball coach.

Cadle was born in Buffalo, New York in 1955. After retiring from coaching in 1997, Cadle presented American football and NBA programming for Sky Sports. Cadle also ran his own channel on YouTube called The SportsHeads, providing honest commentary on the NFL and NBA for a UK audience.

He supported the Buffalo Bills.

Cadle unexpectedly died on the morning of October 16, 2017.

Coaching accomplishments
British Basketball League Champions 1989, 1990, 1991, 1992, 1996 
BBL play-off Champions 1989, 1990, 1991, 1992, 1997 
BBL Cup Winners 1987, 1988, 1989, 1990, 1991 
BBL Trophy Winners 1996, 1997 
Scottish Cup Winners 1984, 1985 
Scottish Play-Off Champions 1984, 1985
English Cup Champions 1986, 1987, 1989, 1990, 1991, 1993, 1996 
World Invitation Club Tournament Champions (WICB) 1990, 1992

Coaching record
Scottish Coach of the Year 1984, 1985
English Coach of the Year 1987, 1989, 1990, 1991, 1992, 1996
Scottish Men's National Team Head Coach 1984, 1985
English Men's National Team Head Coach 1991–1993 
Great Britain Men's National Team Head Coach 1991–1992

Special coaching accomplishments
Placed in the Guinness Book of Records – "Most Successful Team Ever in British Sport" 1989/1990 
Repeated in 1991/1992 Season
British record of more than 300 career league victories – 1998 
Voted into the "Top 50 Most Influential Sportsperson" in Britain – 1996 
Final grouping of the European Club Champions Cup – First Time Ever in Britain 1990/1991 Season: Ranked Number 6 in Europe 
Repeated in 1993/1994 Season 
Final grouping of the European Cup Winners Cup – 1987/1988 Season

References

External links
 Personal website
 Bio on betfair.com
 Profile at BritBall
 The SportsHeads 
 College statistics @ sports-reference.com

Great Britain men's national basketball team coaches
1955 births
2017 deaths
American expatriate basketball people in the United Kingdom
British basketball coaches
British sports broadcasters
National Basketball Association broadcasters
National Football League announcers
Penn State Nittany Lions basketball players
Sportspeople from Buffalo, New York
American men's basketball players